The  New York Knights season was the first and only season for the Arena Football League franchise.

The Knights became an expansion team of the Arena Football League in 1988. The team announced Jim Valek as the first coach in franchise history. The team featured a couple of players from the 1987 New York Giants replacement team, including starting quarterback Jim Crocicchia and his primary receiver Edwin Lovelady, but its desire to fans was questioned before the team began playing games. The Knights won their first game in franchise history, 60–52 over the Los Angeles Cobras. During the Knights home opener, fight erumped in the stands, and items were thrown on the field. After winning the season opener, the Knights lost 4 straight games before returning home to a smaller crowd, losing 22–36 to the Cobras. The Knights would lose 8 straight games before they defeated the Cobras 40–30 in Los Angeles. The team folded after a disappointing 2–8 season.

Regular season

Schedule

Standings

y – clinched regular-season title

x – clinched playoff spot

Roster

Awards

References

External links
1988 New York Knights season at arenafan.com

New York Knights
New York Knights
New York Knights (arena football)
1980s in Manhattan
Madison Square Garden